Ann Rosman (born February 27, 1973) is a Swedish writer known for her crime fiction.

She lives in Marstrand, the setting for her series of novels featuring detective Karin Adler. Before she began writing, Rosman worked as an information technology specialist. Her novel Mercurium is based on actual historical events: the story of Metta Fock, who was convicted of murder in 1805.

She was awarded the Marstrand Prize in 2010. In 2013, she received the Kungälv city council Culture Award.

Selected works 
 Fyrmästarens dotter ("The Lighthouse Keeper's Daughter") (2009)
 Själakistan ("Soul casket") (2010)
 Porto Francos väktare ("Porto Franco Guardian") (2011)
 Mercurium (2012)
 Havskatten ("The Catfish") (2014)
 Vågspel ("Venture") (2016)

References

External links 
 

1973 births
Living people
Swedish crime fiction writers
Swedish women novelists
People from Kungälv Municipality